Matthew Friedman is an American film editor and senior lecturer at the AFI Conservatory. He won the American Cinema Editors Eddie Award for best feature film editing for his work on Palm Springs, which broke the existing Sundance film sales record by sixty-nine cents. Friedman was nominated for the ACE Eddie the previous year as well for The Farewell, his third collaboration with director Lulu Wang, 

His credits also include John Tucker Must Die, What Happens in Vegas, Step Up Revolution, and Alvin and the Chipmunks: The Squeakquel. (edited the second film of Alvin and the Chipmunks; following the retirement of Peter E. Berger) Friedman played the voice of the talking bird in Scary Movie 2.

Friedman is a member of the American Cinema Editors and the Academy of Motion Picture Arts and Sciences.

Partial filmography

References

External links 

 

Year of birth missing (living people)
Living people
American Cinema Editors
Northwestern University alumni
People from Oak Ridge, Tennessee
People from Los Angeles